Solar radius is a unit of distance used to express the size of stars in astronomy relative to the Sun. The solar radius is usually defined as the radius to the layer in the Sun's photosphere where the optical depth equals 2/3:

 is approximately 10 times the average radius of Jupiter, 109 times the radius of the Earth, and 1/215th of an astronomical unit, the approximate distance between Earth and the Sun. The solar radius to either pole and that to the equator differ slightly due to the Sun's rotation, which induces an oblateness in the order of 10 parts per million.

Measurements

The unmanned SOHO spacecraft was used to measure the radius of the Sun by timing transits of Mercury across the surface during 2003 and 2006.

Haberreiter, Schmutz & Kosovichev (2008) determined the radius corresponding to the solar photosphere to be .

Nominal solar radius 

In 2015, the International Astronomical Union passed Resolution B3, which defined a set of nominal conversion constants for stellar and planetary astronomy. Resolution B3 defined the nominal solar radius (symbol ) to be equal to exactly . The nominal value, which is the rounded value, within the uncertainty, given by Haberreiter, Schmutz & Kosovichev (2008), was adopted to help astronomers avoid confusion when quoting stellar radii in units of the Sun's radius, even when future observations will likely refine the Sun's actual photospheric radius (which is currently only known to about an accuracy of ±).

Examples
Solar radii as a unit are common when describing spacecraft moving close to the sun. Two spacecraft in the 2010s include:

Solar Orbiter (as close as )
Parker Solar Probe (as close as )

See also 
 Astronomical unit
 Earth radius
 Jupiter radius
 List of largest known stars
 Orders of magnitude (length)
 Solar luminosity
 Solar mass

References

External links 

Radius
Stellar astronomy
Units of length